Hoplopholcus forskali is a cellar spider species found from Eastern Europe to Turkmenistan.

See also 
 List of Pholcidae species

References 

Pholcidae
Spiders of Europe
Spiders of Asia
Invertebrates of Central Asia
Taxa named by Tamerlan Thorell
Spiders described in 1871